Ibrahim Al Gafar (born 1966) is a Saudi taekwondo practitioner. He competed in the men's featherweight at the 1988 Summer Olympics.

References

External links
 
 

1966 births
Living people
Place of birth unknown
Date of birth unknown
Saudi Arabian male taekwondo practitioners
Olympic taekwondo practitioners of Saudi Arabia
Taekwondo practitioners at the 1988 Summer Olympics
20th-century Saudi Arabian people